The Socialist Party of the Basque Country–Basque Country Left (PSE-EE) is a social-democratic political party in the Basque Country that acts as the regional affiliate of the Spanish Socialist Workers' Party (PSOE).

History
Although local Socialist groups had been active since 1886, and many affiliated with the PSOE (being Biscay one of the strongholds of Spanish social democracy, along with Madrid and Asturias), the PSE was actually established as a branch of the main party only in 1977, during the Spanish transition to democracy, initiated by King Juan Carlos I of Spain.

During the violent years of the 1980s in the Basque Country, mid- and high-ranking party officials held government positions in Spain and the region, as civil governors. The Basque nationalist left—Herri Batasuna and related groups—denounced during that period the collusion of the party with police abuses—especially pointing to the Guardia Civil—and in early 1984 blamed directly the Socialists for the state terrorism of the GAL death squads (1984-1987).

In early 1990s some of them were convicted for their participation in it. Ricardo Damborenea, head of the party in Biscay, even confessed in a press release to his involvement in the criminal pursuit in the early 1990s. All of them have been released from prison much earlier than their due term without apologising for their illegal actions; Damborenea currently gets a substantial monthly allowance from the Spanish state.

It has local associations in Gipuzkoa, Biscay, and Álava. Before June 1982, it also included a Navarre branch - which formed the Socialist Party of Navarre, PSN (PSOE).

Initially in a close alliance with the Basque Country Left (EE), a party connected with Basque nationalism, begun in 1991 with a move promoted by the respective secretaries - Ramón Jáuregui for the PSE and Mario Onaindia for the EE. It aimed to become the major Basque force in the 1993 election. The fusion of the two groups was made possible by the split of Basque Left from EE: prepared by the leadership of Nicolás Redondo Terreros (1998–2002), it was confirmed with the mandate of Patxi López in 2002.

During the 2012 elections to the parliament of the Basque Autonomous Community, the PSE-EE came up third in number of MPs (16), lagging behind the Basque Nationalist Party and EH Bildu. Throughout its recent history, it fluctuated between second and third, depending on the success of the People's Party or the Abertzale Left).

Electoral performance

Basque Parliament

Cortes Generales

European Parliament

Notes

References

External links
 

1977 establishments in Spain
Basque Country
Political parties established in 1977
Socialist parties in the Basque Country (autonomous community)
Organisations based in Bilbao